Jonathan Genest-Jourdain (born July 16, 1979) is a Canadian politician from Quebec. Genest-Jourdain served as the New Democratic Party Member of Parliament for Manicouagan and as a member of the Official Opposition Shadow Cabinet in the 41st Canadian Parliament (2011–2015).

Career
Jonathan Genest-Jourdain entered municipal politics in Sept-Îles, Quebec, in 2009. Through his legal work, Genest-Jourdain has been an ardent activist for Aboriginal, Quebec and Canadian heritage issues.

Genest-Jourdain defeated Bloc Québécois incumbent MP Gérard Asselin at the 2011 Canadian federal election, becoming the first ever NDP member to represent the Manicouagan riding. Along with fellow NDP member Romeo Saganash (who was elected for Abitibi—Baie-James—Nunavik—Eeyou), Genest-Jourdain was one of two First Nations members currently representing Quebec in the House of Commons of Canada. He was a member of the Canadian House of Commons Standing Committee on Aboriginal Affairs and Northern Development.

A member of the Innu Nation, Genest-Jourdain is a lawyer originally from the reserve village of Uashat-Maliotenam located in the Sept-Rivières Regional County Municipality. Genest-Jourdain obtained a law degree from Université Laval in 2004 and started a graduate certificate in corporate law. He has been a member of the Bar of Quebec since 2007. Genest-Jourdain has devoted himself to the application of professional principles, including social intervention.

Genest-Jourdain supported Outremont MP Tom Mulcair's candidacy for federal leadership of the NDP to succeed the late Jack Layton.

Genest-Jourdain finished third in his own riding of Manicouagan in the 2015 Canadian federal election, with the Bloc's Marilène Gill succeeding him as MP.

Shadow Cabinet
Shortly after Genest-Jourdain entered Parliament in May 2011, NDP leader Jack Layton appointed him to the shadow cabinet as Deputy Critic for Aboriginal Affairs and Northern Development.

Election record

Notes

References

External links

 Official NDP site

1979 births
21st-century Canadian politicians
21st-century First Nations people
First Nations politicians
Indigenous Members of the House of Commons of Canada
Innu people
Lawyers in Quebec
Living people
Members of the House of Commons of Canada from Quebec
New Democratic Party MPs
People from Côte-Nord
People from Sept-Îles, Quebec
Université Laval alumni